Rolf  Mützelburg (23 June 1913 – 11 September 1942) was a German U-boat commander during World War II and a recipient of the Knight's Cross of the Iron Cross with Oak Leaves of Nazi Germany. Mützelburg died on active service on 11 September 1942 following an accident at sea.

Career
Mützelburg joined the Reichsmarine of the Weimar Republic on 1 April 1932 as member of "Crew 32" (the incoming class of 1932). After spending two years on minesweepers, in October 1939 he joined the U-boat arm. He spent five months commanding the school boat  from June to November 1940 as part of 21st U-boat Flotilla, receiving his first combat experience aboard  under Joachim Schepke. He commissioned  into 1st U-boat Flotilla in February 1941.

Mützelburg died on 11 September 1942 in a freak accident. He was swimming in the Atlantic south-west of the Azores, and dived from the conning tower, but struck the deck head-first when the U-boat suddenly lurched in the swell. The supply U-boat  arrived the next day with a doctor on board, but too late, and Mützelburg was buried at sea on 12 September 1942.

Awards
 Wehrmacht Long Service Award 4th Class (15 August 1936)
 Iron Cross (1939) 2nd Class (1 July 1941) & 1st Class (1 July 1941)
 U-boat War Badge (1939) (1 July 1941)
 Knight's Cross of the Iron Cross with Oak Leaves
 Knight's Cross on 17 November 1941 as Kapitänleutnant and commander of U-203
 Oak Leaves on 15 July 1942 as Kapitänleutnant and commander of U-203

References

Notes

Bibliography

 
 
 Rohwer, Jürgen (1999). Axis submarine successes of World War Two: German, Italian, and Japanese submarine successes, 1939-1945. Greenhill Books. .
 

1913 births
1942 deaths
Military personnel from Kiel
Kriegsmarine personnel killed in World War II
U-boat commanders (Kriegsmarine)
Recipients of the Knight's Cross of the Iron Cross with Oak Leaves
Reichsmarine personnel
People who died at sea
People from the Province of Schleswig-Holstein
Accidental deaths
Burials at sea
Diving deaths